Keith Howe (birth unknown) is a former rugby union and professional rugby league footballer who played in the 1960s and 1970s.

Playing career

County League appearances
Keith Howe played in Castleford's victory in the Yorkshire County League during the 1964–65 season.

Challenge Cup Final appearances
Keith Howe played right-, i.e. number 3, in Castleford’s 11–6 victory over Salford in the 1969 Challenge Cup Final during the 1968–69 season at Wembley Stadium, London on Saturday 17 May 1969, in front of a crowd of 97,939.

County Cup Final appearances
Keith Howe played , i.e. number 2, in Castleford's 11-22 defeat by Leeds in the 1968 Yorkshire County Cup Final during the 1968–69 season at Belle Vue, Wakefield on Saturday 19 October 1968.

BBC2 Floodlit Trophy Final appearances
Keith Howe played , i.e. number 2, in Castleford's 7-2 victory over Swinton in the 1966 BBC2 Floodlit Trophy Final during the 1966–67 season at Wheldon Road, Castleford on Tuesday 20 December 1966.

Career records
Along with Chris Young of Hull Kingston Rovers, with 34-tries, Keith Howe was the top try-scorer in the Championship First Division during the 1966–67 season.

References

External links
Search for "Howe" at rugbyleagueproject.org
Keith Howe Memory Box Search at archive.castigersheritage.com

Living people
Castleford Tigers players
English rugby league players
Place of birth missing (living people)
Rugby league centres
Rugby league wingers
English rugby union players
Year of birth missing (living people)